Vallis or valles  (plural valles ) is the Latin word for valley. It is used in planetary geology to name landform features on other planets.

Scientists used vallis for old river valleys they discovered when they sent the first probes to Mars. The Viking Orbiters caused a revolution in our ideas about water on Mars; finding huge river valleys in many areas. Space craft cameras showed that floods of water broke through dams, carved deep valleys, eroded grooves into bedrock, and traveled thousands of kilometers.  Some valles on Mars (Mangala Vallis, Athabasca Vallis, Granicus Vallis, and Tinjar Valles) clearly begin at graben.  On the other hand, some of the large outflow channels begin in rubble-filled low areas, called chaos or chaotic terrain.  It has been suggested that massive amounts of water were trapped under pressure beneath a thick cryosphere (layer of frozen ground), then the water was suddenly released, perhaps when the cryosphere was broken by a fault.

Nirgal Vallis and sapping

Nirgal Vallis is one of the longest valley networks on Mars.  It is so large that it is found on more than one quadrangle.  Scientists are not sure about how all the ancient river valleys were formed.  There is evidence that instead of rain or snow, the water that formed the valleys originated underground.  One mechanism that has been advanced is sapping.  In sapping, the ground just gives away as water comes out.  Sapping is common in some desert areas in America's Southwest.  Sapping forms alcoves and stubby tributaries.  These features are visible in the picture from the Coprates quadrangle of Nigal Vallis taken with Mars Odyssey's THEMIS.

Kasei Valles 
One of the most significant features of the Lunae Palus region, Kasei Valles is one of the largest outflow channels on Mars. Like other outflow channels, it was carved by liquid water, probably during gigantic floods.

It begins in Echus Chasma, near Valles Marineris, and empties into Chryse Planitia, not far from where Viking 1 landed. Sacra Mensa, a large tableland divides Kasei into northern and southern channels.

Scientists suggest it was formed by several episodes of flooding and maybe by some glacial activity.

Other valles in the Lunae Palus quadrangle

Valles in the Syrtis Major quadrangle

Valles in the Hellas quadrangle

Lineated Floor Deposits 

The floors of some channels have features called lineated floor deposits.  They are ridged and grooved materials that seem to deflect around obstacles. Scientists believe they are ice-rich. Some glaciers on the Earth show such features. Lineated floor deposits may be related to lobate debris aprons, which have been proven to contain large amounts of ice. Reull Vallis, as pictured below, displays these deposits.

Origin of Dao Vallis
Dao Vallis begins near a large volcano, called Hadriaca Patera, so it is thought to have received water when hot magma melted huge amounts of ice in the frozen ground.  The partially circular depressions on the left side of the channel in the image below suggests that groundwater sapping also contributed water.

Vallis in Elysium quadrangle

Vallis in Oxia Palus quadrangle

Vallis in Memnonia quadrangle

Other examples of valles

See also

References 

Planetary geology
Valleys and canyons on Mars